Zsolt Kovács (born 4 July 1986) is a Hungarian football player, who is currently playing for Büki TK.

References
HLSZ

1986 births
Living people
Sportspeople from Szombathely
Hungarian footballers
Association football defenders
Szombathelyi Haladás footballers